Alexandru Namaşco (born 9 October 1981) is a Moldovan professional football player. He plays for FC Speranţa Crihana Veche.

References

External links
 

1981 births
Living people
Moldovan footballers
Moldova international footballers
Moldovan expatriate footballers
Expatriate footballers in Russia
FC Tiraspol players
FC Sheriff Tiraspol players
FC Torpedo Moscow players
FC Tighina players
Association football midfielders
FC Dynamo Bryansk players